
Gmina Lipinki is a rural gmina (administrative district) in Gorlice County, Lesser Poland Voivodeship, in southern Poland.

Villages
Gmina Lipinki contains the villages and settlements of Bednarka, Bednarskie, Kryg, Lipinki, Pogorzyna, Rozdziele and Wójtowa.

Neighbouring gminas
Gmina Lipinki is bordered by the gminas of Biecz, Dębowiec, Gorlice, Jasło, Sękowa and Skołyszyn.

References
Polish official population figures 2006

Lipinki
Gorlice County